(born January 5, 1982) is a Japanese judoka, who was born in Shimotsuma, Ibaraki Prefecture.
She won the Women's +78 kg category gold medal at the Athens Olympic in 2004 and the silver medal at the Beijing Olympics.

In September 2003, Tsukada won the silver medal at the World judo championship games in Osaka, Japan.
In September 2005, she won the bronze medal at the World judo championship games in Cairo, Egypt. She won gold at the 2007 World Judo Championships in Rio de Janeiro, Brazil.

External links
 

1982 births
Living people
Japanese female judoka
Judoka at the 2004 Summer Olympics
Judoka at the 2008 Summer Olympics
Olympic judoka of Japan
Olympic gold medalists for Japan
Olympic silver medalists for Japan
People from Ibaraki Prefecture
Olympic medalists in judo
Asian Games medalists in judo
Medalists at the 2008 Summer Olympics
Judoka at the 2002 Asian Games
Medalists at the 2004 Summer Olympics
Asian Games silver medalists for Japan
Recipients of the Medal with Purple Ribbon
Medalists at the 2002 Asian Games
Universiade medalists in judo
Universiade silver medalists for Japan
20th-century Japanese women
21st-century Japanese women